The term expected satiety refers to the satiety (relief from hunger) that is expected from a particular food. It is closely associated with 'expected satiation' which refers to the immediate fullness (post meal) that a food is expected to generate.

Scientists have discovered that foods differ considerably in their expected satiety. One estimate suggests that there may be a six-fold difference in  commonly consumed foods (in the UK), when they are compared calorie for calorie. This range of variation is important because expected satiety is thought to be a good predictor of food choice and an excellent predictor of self-selected portion sizes. Specifically, foods that have high expected satiety and high expected satiation tend to be selected in smaller portions (fewer calories). Therefore, they may be especially suited to diets that are designed to reduce energy intake.

Some researchers also suggest that expected satiety is an important mediator of energy intake. They argue that within-meal events (immediate post-ingestive feedback, e.g., gastric stretch) play a relatively minor role and that meal size is largely determined by decisions about portion size, before a meal begins. Consistent with this proposition, observational studies show that 'plate cleaning' is extremely common, that humans tend to plan their meal size in advance, and that ad libitum eating is relatively rare.

Measurement

Early approaches relied on rating scales. More recently, techniques have been developed that quantify expectations very precisely by comparing foods directly on a calorie-for-calorie basis. The first of these used a classical psychophysical approach based on a 'method of constant stimuli'. Participants are shown a fixed 'standard' portion of food and this is compared against a different 'comparison' food. Over a series of trials the size of the comparison food is manipulated and participants are asked to pick the food that is expected to deliver greater satiety. At the end of the task a measure of 'expected satiety' is calculated. This relates to the number of calories of the comparison food that would be expected to deliver the same satiety as the fixed standard. A conceptually similar alternative is to use a 'method of adjustment'. Participants are shown a picture of a standard food next to a picture of a comparison food. Using specialist software, participants change the size of the comparison portion using keyboard responses. Pictures are loaded with sufficient speed that the change in the comparison becomes 'animated.' Participants are told to match the comparison food until both are expected to deliver the same satiety. If the same standard is used then the expected satiety of different foods can be quantified and compared directly.

Determinants

Expectations about the post-ingestive effects of a food are learned over time. In particular, it would appear that the expected satiety and expected satiation of foods increases as they become familiar.

Expectations are also thought to be governed by the orosensory characteristics of food. Even subtle changes to the flavor or texture of food can have a marked effect. Expected satiation may be higher in foods that have a higher protein content, and in those that require more chewing and that are eaten slowly. Remarkably, it also appears that the expected satiety and expected satiation of foods is influenced by their perceived weight.

Effect on appetite

The effects of expected satiety and expected satiation appear to extend beyond meal planning. Several studies show that these expectations also influence the hunger and fullness that is experienced after a meal has been consumed.  Product labelling and branding is likely to modify expected satiety. Therefore, this kind of information has the potential to influence appetite directly. Together, these observations are consistent with emerging evidence that implicates hippocampal-dependent memory mechanisms in behavioural responses to food.

Notes
Recent reviews highlight opportunities to reformulate commercial food products to increase their expected satiety and expected satiation.

See also 
 Satiety value

References

Food science
Eating behaviors of humans
Articles containing video clips